For the ironworks in the US state of Virginia, see Tredegar Iron Works.

Tredegar Iron and Coal Company was an important 19th century ironworks in Tredegar, Wales, which due to its need for coke became a major developer of coal mines and particularly the Sirhowy Valley of South Wales. It is most closely associated with the Industrial Revolution and coal mining in the South Wales Valleys.

Background
In 1778 an iron furnace was built in the upper Sirhowy Valley by Thomas Atkinson and William Barrow, who came to the area from London. Fuel was needed for the furnace so men were employed to dig coal at Bryn Bach and Nantybwch, the first small scale coal mining operation in the area. The furnace failed in 1794, and hence also the business.

Sirhowy Ironworks
In 1797, Samuel Homfray, with partners Richard Fothergill and the Matthew Monkhouse built a new furnace which they called the Sirhowy Ironworks, leasing the land in Bedwellty, Newport from the Tredegar Estate.

In 1800, the company was renamed the Tredegar Iron Company, named in honour of the Tredegar Estate at Tredegar House and Tredegar Park in Newport. The company was taken over by the Harfords of Ebbw Vale in 1818.

It was expanded in the late 1830s and early 1840s, producing significant volumes of rails, largely for export. The works was purchased by the Tredegar Iron Company Limited in 1873 and nine years later began to produce steel.

Operations
The company ironworks were developed on a single site, which later became known as Whiteheads, after that company took over the southern section of the site in 1907. By 1850, TICC employed between 2000 and 3000 people at its 9 furnaces, mills shops and ancillary plants.

However, all of this production on such a vast scale had a price. Adrian Vaughn, in his 1985 book "Grub, Water & Relief," mentions that in 1832 John Gooch took a managerial post in the Tredegar iron works:

With many people in such a small area, and with poor sanitation provision, there were several cholera epidemics in the town in the 19th century. A dedicated cholera burial ground was later established at Cefn Golau.

1875-1946
In 1875, the company renamed itself the Tredegar Iron and Coal Company, to allow development of additional coal mining capacity.

In 1891, the company ceased production of iron, but continued to develop coal mines and produce coal. The former Tredegar Ironworks were effectively abandoned, with Whiteheads taking over the southern section of the site from 1907. In 1931, they also closed down their operations, moving everything to their Newport works.

TICC continued to develop coal mines and work pitts, until it was nationalised in 1946, becoming part of the National Coal Board. Its last chairman was Henry McLaren, 2nd Baron Aberconway.

Though now almost entirely redeveloped, traces of the terracing of the valley sides at the site can still be noted at OS grid reference SO 155093.

Mines developed by the company
1806: The Dukes Pit, Tredegar. Named after the Duke of Beaufort on whose land it was sunk
1806: Pwll Mawr, Neath
1834: Trist No.1 and No.2 pits
1841: Upper Ty Trist Pit
1850: Bedwellty Pits
1868: Trist No.3 Pit
1876: Witworth Colliery
1876: Pochin Colliery
1898: McLaren Colliery
1907: Oakdale Colliery
1908: Waterloo Colliery
1910: Markham Colliery
1926: Wyllie Colliery

References

External links

History of the Sirhowy Valley

Ironworks and steelworks in Wales
Coal mining in Wales
Coal companies of the United Kingdom
Defunct companies of Wales
Industrial Revolution
History of Glamorgan

Energy companies established in 1797
Manufacturing companies established in 1797
Non-renewable resource companies established in 1875
Manufacturing companies disestablished in 1946
Non-renewable resource companies disestablished in 1946
1797 establishments in Wales
1946 disestablishments in Wales
Tredegar
British companies established in 1797
British companies disestablished in 1946